Edward G. ("Ted") Carmines is an American political scientist, and serves as Distinguished Professor, Warner O. Chapman Professor of Political Science, and Rudy Professor at Indiana University. At IU, he directs the Center on American Politics and serves as Director of Research for the Center on Representative Government.

Biography
Carmines was born in 1946. He graduated from Old Dominion University, received his Master's from the College of William & Mary, and earned his PhD at the University at Buffalo.

He was appointed Assistant Professor of Political Science  at Indiana University  in 1976, promoted to Associate Professor in 1980 and to full Professor in 1984.  He received the title of Rudy Professor of Political Science  in 1993, and Warner O. Chapman Professor of Political Science  in 2001 He became Distinguished Professor in 2013.

Honors 
He was elected Fellow, American Association for the Advancement of Science, 2011 and  Fellow, American Academy of Arts and Sciences in 2012,

Published books 
His published books are:

 Beyond the Left-Right Divide: Ideological Diversity and the Future of American Politics (with Michael Ensley and Michael W. Wagner)   Harvard University Press, in press.
 Reaching Beyond Race (with Paul M. Sniderman) Cambridge: Harvard University Press, 1997 
 Prejudice, Politics and the American Dilemma (edited with Paul M. Sniderman and Philip E. Tetlock) Stanford: Stanford University Press, 1993 
 Issue Evolution: Race and the Transformation of American Politics  (with James A. Stimson) Princeton: Princeton University Press, 1989 
 Unidimensional Scaling (with John P. McIver) Sage University Paper Series on Quantitative Applications in the Social Sciences, Beverly Hills and London: Sage Publications, 1981 
 Measurement in the Social Sciences: The Link Between Theory and Data  (with Richard A. Zeller) New York: Cambridge University Press, 1980
 Reliability and Validity Assessment (with Richard A. Zeller) Sage University Paper Series on Quantitative Applications in the Social Sciences, Beverly Hills and London: Sage Publications, 1979
 Statistical Analysis of Social Data (with Richard A. Zeller) Chicago: Rand McNally, 1978)

References 

1946 births
Living people
American political scientists
College of William & Mary alumni
University at Buffalo alumni